The Australia national women's water polo team represents Australia in women's international water polo competitions and is controlled by Water Polo Australia. It was one of the most successful women's water polo teams in the world. It is currently organised into the Asia/Oceania regional group.

History
The Australia women's water polo team played their first international in 1975. Since that time they have gone from strength to strength. The team have often had to struggle with lack of funding, but despite that continued to perform credibly on the international stage.

Following 6th place at the 1994 World Aquatics Championships in Rome, Italy, they won the women's Water polo World Cup at home in Sydney, Australia, in 1995. In 1996, the women won the silver medal in the Olympic Year Tournament behind the Netherlands, then finished with bronze in the following year's World Cup in Nancy, France. Australia continued their successful mid-1990s run by winning the bronze medal at the 1998 World Aquatics Championships in Perth, and remarkably over the rest of 1998 and 1999 were unbeatable, winning the four international tournaments they contested in the Netherlands, Italy, the United States and Hungary.

After an incredible 14 month winning streak, they only managed the silver at the 1999 world cup in Winnipeg, Canada.

Another success came in 1997 when it was announced that women's Water polo would be included in the Olympic Games for the first time at their home Olympics in 2000 Summer Olympics.

Having had an excellent build up to the Sydney 2000, the team went into the first Olympic tournament at home. They lost one match to the powerful Dutch side in that historic campaign, on the way to winning their inaugural women's Olympic gold medal in front of an ecstatic home crowd.

In an incredible Olympic final, the evenly matched US and Australia sides were tied 3–3 with 1.3 seconds remaining on the clock, when Yvette Higgins blasted in a nine-metre shot from a free throw. The ball crossed the goal-line 0.2s from the final hooter to give Australia a 4–3 win, and the gold medal.

The Australia gold team medalists were: Naomi Castle, Jo Fox, Bridgette Gusterson (C), Simone Hankin, Kate Hooper, Yvette Higgins, Bronwyn Mayer, Gail Miller, Melissa Mills, Debbie Watson, Liz Weekes, Danielle Woodhouse, and Taryn Woods.

The team was brought back down to earth with an Olympic hangover in 2001, only managing 5th in the World Championships of that year. This dip in form was short lived, however, as they won the inaugural Commonwealth Water Polo Championships title in Manchester, England in 2002, beating world No 3 Canada 6–5 in the final.

Australia then suffered another lean patch, finishing 7th at the 2003 World Aquatics Championships in Barcelona, Spain, 4th at the 2004 Summer Olympics in Athens, and 6th at the 2005 World Aquatics Championships in Montreal, Quebec, Canada.

The team returned to successful ways by taking the bronze at the 2005 FINA Water Polo World League event in Kirishi, Russia, and at the 2007 Water polo world championship in Melbourne, Australia by taking the silver medal, after losing a hard fought final 5–6 to the US team.

At the 2008 Summer Olympics, the team took the bronze medal after beating Hungary for 3rd place in a penalty shootout.

Olympic record

Honours
Water polo at the Summer Olympics:

 Gold medal 2000 Sydney Olympics
 Bronze medal 2008 Beijing Olympics
 Bronze medal 2012 London Olympics

World Championships:

 Gold medal 1986 Madrid
 Silver medal 2007  Melbourne
 Silver medal 2013 Barcelona
 Bronze medal 1998 Perth
 Bronze medal 2019 Gwangju

FINA World Cup:

 Gold medal 1984 Los Angeles
 Gold medal 1995 Sydney
 Gold medal 2006 Tianjin
 Silver medal 1991 Long Beach
 Silver medal 1999 Winnipeg
 Silver medal 2010 Christchurch
 Silver medal 2014 Khanty-Mansiysk
 Bronze medal 1979 Merced, California 
 Bronze medal 1981 Brisbane 
 Bronze medal 1983 Quebec City
 Bronze medal 1997 Nancy

Commonwealth Water Polo Championships:
 Gold medal Manchester 2002
 Gold medal Perth 2006

Results

Olympic Games

 2000 – 1st place
 2004 – 4th place
 2008 – 3rd place
 2012 – 3rd place
 2016 – 6th place
 2020 – 5th place

Olympic Year Tournament
 1996 – 2nd place

World Championship

 1986 – 1st place
 1991 – 5th place
 1994 – 6th place
 1998 – 3rd place
 2001 – 5th place
 2003 – 7th place
 2005 – 6th place
 2007 – 2nd place
 2009 – 6th place
 2011 – 5th place
 2013 – 2nd place
 2015 – 4th place
 2017 – 8th place
 2019 – 3rd place
 2022 – 6th place

World Cup

 1979 – 3rd place
 1980 – 4th place
 1981 – 3rd place
 1983 – 3rd place
 1984 – 1st place
 1988 – 5th place
 1989 – 5th place
 1991 – 2nd place
 1993 – 4th place
 1995 – 1st place
 1997 – 3rd place
 1999 – 2nd place
 2002 – 6th place
 2006 – 1st place
 2010 – 2nd place
 2014 – 2nd place
 2018 - 3rd place

World League

 2004 – 7th place
 2005 – 3rd place
 2006 – 4th place
 2007 – 2nd place
 2008 – 3rd place
 2009 – 3rd place
 2010 – 2nd place
 2011 – 3rd place
 2012 – 2nd place
 2013 – 7th place
 2014 – 3rd place
 2015 – 2nd place
 2016 – 3rd place
 2017 – 7th place
 2018 – 7th place
 2019 – 5th place
 2022 – 6th place

Commonwealth Championship

 2002 –  Gold medal
 2006 –  Gold medal

Holiday Cup

 1998 – 1st place
 1999 – 1st place
 2000 – 3rd place
 2003 – 4th place
 2006 – 3rd place
 2007 – 5th place

Team

Current squad
Roster for the 2020 Summer Olympics.

Squads

 1984 FINA World Cup –  Gold medal
Kerri Cain, Lisa Copeland, Debbie Handley, Amanda Leeson, Jackie Northam, Katie McAdams, Wendy Meloncelli, Kerry Mills, Sandy Mills, Cathy Parkers, Janet Rayner, Julie Sheperd, and Debbie Watson.
 1986 World Championship –  Gold medal
Judy Gair, Debbie Handley, Amanda Leeson, Katie McAdams, Megan Meloncelli, Wendy Meloncelli, Lynne Morrison, Sandy Mills, Jackie Northam, Cathy Parkers, Janet Rayner, Julie Sheperd, and Debbie Watson.
 1995 FINA World Cup –  Gold medal
Naomi Castle, Loris Darvill, Kylie English, Claire Finucane, Bridgette Gusterson, Yvette Higgins, Bronwyn Mayer, Stephanie Neesham, Debbie Watson, Liz Weekes, Sharan Wheelock, Danielle Woodhouse, and Taryn Woods.
 1998 World Championship –  Bronze medal
Naomi Castle, Simone Dixon, Kylie English, Bridgette Gusterson, Yvette Higgins, Bronwyn Mayer, Melissa Mills, Stephanie Neesham, Marian Taylor, Liz Weekes, Sharan Wheelock, Danielle Woodhouse, and Taryn Woods.
 2000 Summer Olympics –  Gold medal
Naomi Castle, Joanne Fox, Bridgette Gusterson, Simone Hankin, Yvette Higgins, Kate Hooper, Bronwyn Mayer, Gail Miller, Melissa Mills, Debbie Watson, Liz Weekes, Danielle Woodhouse, and Taryn Woods. Head Coach: István Görgényi.
 2003 World Championship – 7th place
Emma Knox, Rebecca Rippon, Nikita Cuffe, Naomi Castle, Bronwyn Smith, Jemma Brownlow, Jodie Stuhmcke, Kate Gynther, Elise Norwood, Taryn Woods, Melissa Rippon, Joanne Fox, and Melissa Byram. Head Coach: István Görgényi.
 2004 Summer Olympics – 4th place
Belinda Brooks, Jemma Brownlow, Naomi Castle, Nikita Cuffe, Joanne Fox, Kate Gynther, Kelly Heuchan, Emma Knox, Elise Norwood, Melissa Rippon, Rebecca Rippon, Bronwyn Smith, and Jodie Stuhmcke.
 2005 FINA World League –  Bronze medal
Victoria Brown, Nikita Cuffe, Erin Douglass, Taniele Gofers, Kate Gynther, Fiona Hammond, Alicia McCormack (goal), Kelly Miller, Elise Norwood, Patrice O'Neill, Melissa Rippon (goal), Rebecca Rippon, and Mia Santoromito.
 2006 FINA World League – 4th place
Gemma Beadsworth, Nicole Dyson, Suzie Fraser, Kate Gynther, Fiona Hammond, Bronwen Knox, Alicia McCormack (goal), Jane Moran, Patrice O'Neill, Melissa Rippon (goal), Rebecca Rippon, Mia Santoromito, and Sophie Smith. Head Coach: Greg McFadden.
 2007 World Championship  Silver medal
Gemma Beadsworth, Nikita Cuffe, Hadley Gemma, Taniele Gofers, Kate Gynther, Amy Hetzel, Bronwen Knox, Emma Knox, Alicia McCormack, Melissa Rippon, Rebecca Rippon, and Mia Santoromito. Head Coach: Greg McFadden.
 2007 FINA World League –  Silver medal
Lea Barta, Victoria Brown, Jemma Dessauvagie, Erin Douglas, Katie Finucane, Suzie Fraser, Kate Gynther, Gemma Hadley, Fiona Hammond, Jane Moran, Melissa Rippon, Mia Santoromito, and Larissa Webster. Head Coach: Greg McFadden.
 2007 Holiday Cup – 5th place
Victoria Brown, Nikita Cuffe, Katie Finucane, Kate Gynther, Fiona Hammond, Bronwen Knox, Alicia McCormack, Sarah Mills, Jane Moran, Melissa Rippon, Rebecca Rippon, Jenna Santoromito, Mia Santoromito, and Sophie Smith. Head Coach: Greg McFadden.
 2008 Summer Olympics –  Bronze medal
Gemma Beadsworth, Nikita Cuffe, Suzie Fraser, Taniele Gofers, Kate Gynther, Amy Hetzel, Bronwen Knox, Emma Knox, Alicia McCormack, Melissa Rippon, Rebecca Rippon, Jenna Santoromito, and Mia Santoromito. Head Coach: Greg McFadden.

Under-20 team
Australia's women have won two titles at the FINA Junior Water Polo World Championships.

See also
 Australia women's Olympic water polo team records and statistics
 Australia men's national water polo team
 List of Olympic champions in women's water polo
 List of women's Olympic water polo tournament records and statistics
 List of world champions in women's water polo

References

External links
Water Polo Australia

 
Women's national water polo teams
Women's water polo in Australia